Danish Dance Theatre  Danish Dance Theatre is the largest modern dance company in Denmark. The company was founded in 1981 by Randi Patterson, an English/Norwegian choreographer and innovator of modern dance. Patterson was succeeded by American Warren Spears, Dane Anette Abildgaard and British Tim Rushton. Swedish choreographer and filmmaker Pontus Lidberg is artistic director from April 2018. Danish Dance Company is based in Copenhagen.

History 

Since 2001, Tim Rushton (MBE) has been the company's Artistic Director and has successfully continued Danish Dance Theatre's vision of combining the classical arts with the modern. Today, Danish Dance Theatre is the foremost contemporary dance company in Denmark, as well as the largest. The company is composed of hand-picked dancers from all over the world.

Especially during the early years, stories and literary sources have often been a central role in the inspiration and creation of the company's performances. The company often collaborates with well-known writers, visual artists and composers and the music often ranges from classical masterpieces to jazz, rock and new compositions.

Danish Dance Theatre receives an annual operating subsidy from the Ministry of Culture. Since the company's funding represents approximately half the financial support that other comparable Nordic companies receive, it is necessary to have additional financial backing from private companies, foundations and endowments.

Until 2005, Danish Dance Theatre was a touring company with no permanent stage. In 2005, the company moved to Folketeatret in Copenhagen, where they had both a permanent stage and dance studio. In November 2009, the company moved from Folketeatret to DANSEhallerne and together with Dansescenen and Dansens Hus they are now situated on the former site of the Carlsberg Brewery. Between national touring, international touring and stationary performances, the company conducts between 60-80 performances annually.
Danish Dance Theatre was founded in 1981 by the English/Norwegian choreographer and pioneer Randi Patterson, in collaboration with Anette Abildgaard, Ingrid Buchholtz, Mikala Barnekow and soon after, Warren Spears. At that time, the company was named ‘New Danish Dance Theatre.’
 
The repertoire spans from large stage productions at the Royal Danish Theatre, Danish Dance Theatre also does an extensive amount of both national and international touring. Besides touring and several stationary performances in Copenhagen, the company is also famous for two annual open-air events: “Copenhagen Summer Dance”, which takes place in the Copenhagen Police Headquarters and runs for one week in August and the picnic-performances “Spring Dance at Carlsberg”, which takes place during the two first weekends of June.

The company's Artistic Director Tim Rushton has been nominated ten times for Best Dance Performance of the Year at the Danish Theatre Awards, Reumert, receiving the award four times; in 1999 for Busy Being Blue, in 2005 for Chalk, in 2006 for Requiem and in 2009 for Labyrinth. In 2010, Danish Dance Theatre received the Reumert Award for Frost, choreographed by Tina Tarpgaard. Since Rushton came to Danish Dance Theatre in 2001, the company has quadrupled the number of audience members.

In addition, Rushton has received many other awards. In 2006 he received the Teaterkatten (Theatrecat) award as best director, a title awarded by “The Association of Danish Theatre Journalists”. In 2007 he received the “National Arts Foundation Award” for exceptional works of art for the 2006 performance Requiem. In 2008 he received “The Danish Arts Society” award and in 2009 “The Wilhelm Hansen Foundation” award.

In 2011 he was honoured with the British MBE – Member of the Order of the British Empire – for his outstanding work for modern dance.
In 2012 Tim Rushton received an Honorary Award at the Danish Theatre Awards, Reumert - this award is given an artist who through the years has made a unique contribution to the positive development of the performing arts in Denmark - and who is still actively performing.

Awards 

Won the Danish Reumert Award for Best Danceperformance in:
 1999 Busy Being Blue
 2005 Kridt (Chalk)
 2006 Requiem
 2009 Labyrint

Nominated for the Reumert Award for Best Danceperformance in:
 1998 Udflugt i det blå
 2000 Dominium
 2006 Silent Steps
 2006 Animal Park
 2008 Passion
 2012 Love Songs

Important productions 

 2012
 MONOLITH: Danish Dance Theatre, at the Royal Theatre, May 10, 2012. Danish premiere of the performance created by Tim Rushton for Rambert Dance Company, Sadlers Wells in 2011
 END OF LONELINESS: Danish Dance Theatre
 2011
 LOVE SONGS: Danish Dance Theatre, at the Royal Theatre. Premiere 26 May 2011, 
 "Spring dance på Carlsberg", outdoor danceevent in the beautiful garden of "J.C. Jacobsens Have" at Carlsberg, Copenhagen
 Danish Dance Theatre's festival Copenhagen Summer Dance in Copenhagen's Politigård. Performing companies: Danish Dance Theatre and other international contemporary dance companies. Guest choreographer Stephen Shropshire
 UK Tour with Dance Touring Partnership presenting: KRIDT (CHALK), ENIGMA and CADANCE.
 Danish Tour presenting: LOVE
 2010
 "Spring dance på Carlsberg", outdoor danceevent in the beautiful garden of "J.C. Jacobsens Have" at Carlsberg, Copenhagen
 Danish Dance Theatre's festival Copenhagen Summer Dance in Copenhagen's Politigård. Performing companies: Danish Dance Theatre, Beijing Dance Theatre, Rambert Dance Company
 2009
 CADANCE: Danish Dance Theatre
 ENIGMA: Danish Dance Theatre
 Danish Dance Theatre festival Copenhagen Summerdance, Copenhagen's Politigård. Performing companies: Danish Dance Theatre, Marie Brolin Tani Unga Danskompagni, The Finnish National Ballet, Skånes Dansteater.
 2008
 LABYRINTH: Danish Dance Theatre
 Received Danish award for performance arts, Årets Reumert, for Best Dance Production of the Year
 2007
 PASSION IN COOPERATION WITH THE PAINTER MICHAEL KVIUM: Danish Dance Theatre – Nominated for Danish award for performance arts, Årets Reumert, for Best Dance Production of the Year
 Jacob's Pillow
 Danish Dance Theatre festival Copenhagen Summerdance, Copenhagen's Politigård. Performing companies: Danish Dance Theatre, Marie Brolin Tani Company Carte Blanche, Johan Kobborg.
 Beijing
 2006
 ANIMAL PARK: Danish Dance Theatre
 Nominated for Danish award for performance arts, Årets Reumert, for Best Dance Production of the Year
 Dance Salad, Houston
 Danish Dance Theatre festival Copenhagen Summerdance, Copenhagen's Politigård. Performing companies: Danish Dance Theatre, The Royal Swedish Ballet, Carte Blanche.
 2005
 SILENT STEPS: Danish Dance Theatre
 Nominated for Danish award for performance arts, Årets Reumert, for Best Dance Production of the Year
 KRIDT: Danish Dance Theatre
 Danish Dance Theatre festival Copenhagen Summerdance, Copenhagen's Politigård. Performing companies: Danish Dance Theatre, Skånes Dansteater, The Finnish National  Ballet.
Received Danish award for performance arts, Årets Reumert, for Best Dance Production of the Year
 2004
 GRAFFITI: Danish Dance Theatre
 Jacob's Pillow
 Danish Dance Theatre festival Copenhagen Summerdance, Copenhagen's Politigård. Performing companies: Danish Dance Theatre, Gøteborg Operaens Ballet, The Norwegian National Ballet.
 Danish Dance Theatre opens the new Copenhagen opera house's Takkeloftet
 Sidney Opera
 2003
 NAPOLI – DEN NYE BY: Danish Dance Theatre
 SuperDanish at Harbourfront, Canada
 major tour of the Middle East
 2002
  WORKING MAN: Danish Dance Theatre
 2001
 SHADOWLAND: Danish Dance Theatre

Important international performances 

 2013
 USA Tour with LOVE SONGS, Washington & New York
 2012
 Rialto Theatre 15th International Dance Festival in Limassol, Cyprus
 2011–12
 LOVE SONGS at KulturStadtLev FORUM, Germany
 Beijing Fringe Festival, China
 Vitabergsparken, Stockholms Parkteatern, Sweden
 2011
 UK Tour with Dance Touring Partnership presenting: KRIDT (CHALK), ENIGMA and CADANCE.
 Warwick Arts Centre, Coventry. Lighthouse Poole. Corn Exchange, Brighton Dome. The Lowry, Salford. Grand Opera House, Belfast. Macrobert, Sterling, Nottingham Playhouse. Northern Stage, Newcastle. Lyceum Theatre, Sheffield.
 Performing KRIDT (CHALK), ENIGMA and CADANCE at the Finnish National Ballet.
 2010–11
 Open Look Festival in Jerusalem, Israel
 Open Look Festival in St. Petersburg, Russia
 2010
 Touring internationally with KRIDT (CHALK), ENIGMA and CADANCE to USA, Poland, Russia, Finland, Norway, Germany and France.
 2009–10
 Performing KRIDT (CHALK)& SHADOWLAND at Künstlerhaus Mousonturm, Germany.
 Performing ENGIMA, KRIDT(CHALK)& 'CADANCE' at Kuopio Dance Festival in Finland.
 Performing KRIDT (CHALK) & SHADOWLAND at The Biarritz Festival, France.
 2008–9
 ANIMAL PARK at Alexander Theatre Helsinki in Finland
 2007–8
 Company in Residence, Joyce Soho, New York City, USA
 New York, USA. Chinese Tour. Moscow, Rusland
 2006–7
 Beijing, China
 2005–6
 Dance Salad, Houston
 2004–05
 Sidney Opera House, Australia
 Jacobs Pillow, USA
 2004
 Jacobs Pillow, USA
 2003–04
 Extensive tour in the Middle East
 SuperDanish at ’Harbourfront’, Canada.
 2002
 Cairo in Egypt
 Damaskus in Syria

Reviews 
 NY Times review by Gia Kourlas, October 13, 2007
 NY Times review by Jennifer Dunning, July 29, 2006
 NY Times review by Anna Kisselgoff, July 14, 2004
 Village Voice review  by Deborah Jowitt, August 4, 2006
 Ballet-Dance Magazine review by Kate Snedeker, May 5, 2006

References

External links 
 

Contemporary dance in Copenhagen
Modern dance companies
Dance companies in Denmark